Gomyo Dam  is a gravity dam located in Kagawa Prefecture in Japan. The dam is used for flood control and water supply. The catchment area of the dam is 10.4 km2. The dam can store 6450 thousand cubic meters of water. The construction of the dam was started on 1995.

See also
List of dams in Japan

References

Dams in Kagawa Prefecture